The United States Navy lists two vessels with the name USS Tanager:

  laid down on 28 September 1917 at New York City.
  laid down at Lorain, Ohio, on 29 March 1944.

References 

United States Navy ship names